Walter Peter Steffen (October 9, 1886 – March 9, 1937) was an American college football player and coach, lawyer, politician, and judge. He emerged on the national scene as a high school quarterback, leading his North Division High School team of Chicago to an intersectional championship over Boys High School of Brooklyn by a score of 75–0 that ended after three quarters because of darkness. Steffen and his team helped introduce the more open style of play that prevailed in the Midwest. He played college football as a quarterback at the University of Chicago from 1906 to 1908 and was a two-time All-American selection. Steffen served as the head football coach at the Carnegie Institute of Technology—now known as Carnegie Mellon University–from 1914 to 1932, compiling a record of 88–53–9. He was inducted into the College Football Hall of Fame as a player in 1969.

Steffen graduated from the University of Chicago Law School in 1912 and was admitted to the Illinois state bar the same year. He served as assistant United States Attorney under James Herbert Wilkerson and then as an alderman on the Chicago City Council, representing the 23rd Ward. He had been elected to fill the seat left vacant earlier that year after the resignation of John Kjellander.
In 1922, Steffen was elected to the Superior Court of Cook County as a Republican. He resigned from the City Council to assume this judgeship and served on the court until his death. Steffen's health declined in the 1930s. He was operated on for gall stones in 1930 and a kidney ailment in 1936. In early 1937, he was diagnosed with a brain tumor. He died at his home, in Chicago, on March 9, 1937.

Head coaching record

References

External links
 
 

1886 births
1937 deaths
American football quarterbacks
Carnegie Mellon Tartans football coaches
Chicago Maroons football players
All-American college football players
College Football Hall of Fame inductees
Chicago City Council members
Illinois Republicans
Judges of the Superior Court of Cook County
University of Chicago Law School alumni
Lawyers from Chicago
Sportspeople from Chicago
Coaches of American football from Illinois
Players of American football from Chicago
Deaths from brain cancer in the United States